is a former Japanese football player who lastly featured for Gainare Tottori.

Career
After a five-years tenure and ten years with Omiya Ardija, Kataoka signed for Gainare Tottori in December 2015.

Club career statistics
Updated to 2 February 2018.

References

External links

J.League profile

1982 births
Living people
Kokushikan University alumni
Association football people from Saitama Prefecture
Japanese footballers
J1 League players
J2 League players
J3 League players
Omiya Ardija players
Kyoto Sanga FC players
Gainare Tottori players
Association football defenders